The 2011 Georgia Tech Yellow Jackets football team represented the Georgia Institute of Technology in the 2011 NCAA Division I FBS football season. The Yellow Jackets were led by fourth year head coach Paul Johnson and played their home games at Bobby Dodd Stadium. They are members of the Coastal Division of the Atlantic Coast Conference. They finished the season 8–5, 5–3 in ACC play to finish in a tie for second place in the Coastal Division. They were invited to the Sun Bowl where they were defeated by Utah 27–30 in overtime.

Schedule

Rankings

Game summaries

Clemson

References

Georgia Tech
Georgia Tech Yellow Jackets football seasons
Georgia Tech Yellow Jackets football